Orphan is the debut album by the Florida-based nu metal/alternative metal music group Darwin's Waiting Room. The album was released on July 24, 2001 via MCA. The album peaked at No. 19 on the Billboard Heatseekers chart that year.

Track listing

Personnel
Michael "Grimm" Falk - emcee
Jabe – vocals
Eddie "The Kydd" Rendini – guitar
Joe "Johnny 5" Perrone – drums
Alex Cando – bass

Production
Jason Bieler – producer
Stephen Marcussen – mastering
David Boucher – mixing
Bob Clearmountain – mixing
Keith Rose – engineer
Jeanne Venton – production Coordination
Fred Weiss – photography

References

2001 debut albums
Darwin's Waiting Room albums
MCA Records albums